Franz Hayler (29 August 1900 in Schwarzenfeld – 11 September 1972 in Aschau im Chiemgau) was a German self-employed salesman who rose during the Third Reich to become State Secretary in the Reich Ministry of Economics and deputy to the Reich Economics Minister. He was a member of the NSDAP and the SS.

Career
Hayler became involved in politics early on, fighting in the Freikorps Oberland against the Bavarian Soviet Republic, in the Ruhr area and Upper Silesia, and was a participant in Adolf Hitler's failed Beerhall Putsch. On 1 December 1931, he joined the Nazi Party as member no. 754133, as well as the SS (membership no. 64697) on 23 March 1934, where in 1939 he rose to Standartenführer (Colonel), and later Brigadeführer (Major General) at the SD's main office.

Hayler, who had been a self-employed salesman since 1927, furthermore took up offices in many economic associations, becoming in June 1933 the leader of the Reich Association of Sellers of Colonial-Ware, Delicatessen and Retail Food Dealers Federation (registered club, i.e. e.V.), shortened to Rekofei, and from 1934 to 1943 leader of Wirtschaftsgruppe Einzelhandel ("Economic Group Retail"), and still later, in 1938, leader of the Reichsgruppe Handel (Reich Group Commerce).

From 11 September 1942 and until the end of World War II, he was a member of the Reichstag, taking a position in the Reich Economics Ministry in November 1943, where he was appointed State Secretary and Deputy to Walther Funk, the Reich Economics Minister.

References

External links
 

1900 births
1972 deaths
20th-century Freikorps personnel
Nazi Party officials
Nazis who participated in the Beer Hall Putsch
People from the Kingdom of Bavaria
Nazi Party politicians
SS-Brigadeführer
Members of the Reichstag of Nazi Germany
Recipients of the Knights Cross of the War Merit Cross